Niall Joseph Huggins (born 18 December 2000) is a professional footballer who plays as a left-back and right back  for English EFL Championship club Sunderland. Born in England, he represents Wales internationally.

Early life
Huggins was born in York and grew up in Fulford, on the outskirts of York. He attended Fulford School in Fulford.

Club career

Leeds United
After winning his division with under-8s junior side Heworth, he joined Leeds United's academy in 2009, alongside Kane Rogerson and future professional Jack Clarke. He graduated through their academy and, alongside Clarke, signed a two-year scholarship with Leeds United in May 2017. Upon signing his scholarship deal with Leeds United, he stated that he was "looking forward to the next two years", adding that he will be "working hard and putting all my effort into, hopefully, getting a 'pro' deal at the end of it". Following his two-year scholarship, he signed a year-long professional contract with Leeds in May 2019. In December 2020, he signed a contract lasting until the end of the 2022–23 season. Huggins made his professional debut as a 54th-minute substitute for Ezgjan Alioski in a 4–2 defeat at Arsenal on 14 February 2021.

Sunderland
On 20 August 2021, Huggins joined EFL League One side Sunderland on a four-year deal. It was reported by BBC Radio Leeds that he joined the club on a free transfer, but the deal included a sell-on fee.

International career
Huggins was born in England, and is of Welsh descent through his father. Huggins made his debut for the Wales national under-21 side on 9 June 2019 in a 2–1 defeat to Albania.

Style of play
Huggins played as a forward for Leeds' under-18 side, but transitioned to play as a left-back for their under-23 side.

Career statistics

Honours
Sunderland
 EFL League One play-offs: 2022

References

External links

Niall Huggins at SoccerAssociation 

2000 births
Living people
Footballers from York
Welsh footballers
Wales youth international footballers
Wales under-21 international footballers
English footballers
English people of Welsh descent
Association football fullbacks
Leeds United F.C. players
Sunderland A.F.C. players
Premier League players